The Warm Touch is an album by Harry Belafonte, released by RCA Records in 1971.

Track listing
 "Something in the Way She Moves" (James Taylor) – 3:10
 "Circle 'Round the Sun" (James Taylor) – 3:15
 "The Paris Song" (Jake Holmes) – 3:19
 "Louise" (Valentine Pringle) – 3:50
 "No Regrets" (Tom Rush) – 3:41
 "Cycles" (Gayle Caldwell) – 4:07
 "The Circle Game" (Joni Mitchell) – 4:07
 "Her Song" (Jake Holmes) – 3:45
 "Rainy Day Man" (James Taylor) – 3:32
 "Fare Thee Well" (Traditional, Fred Brooks) – 3:26

Personnel
Harry Belafonte – vocals
Arranged and conducted by William Eaton (2, 4, 5, 7, 9, 10)
Arranged and conducted by Robert Freedman (1, 3, 6, 8)
Production notes:
Jack Pleis – producer
Bob Simpson – engineer

References

1971 albums
Harry Belafonte albums
RCA Records albums
Albums produced by Jack Pleis